Frida is the original soundtrack album, on the Universal label, of the 2002 Academy Award- and Golden Globe Award-winning film Frida starring Salma Hayek, Alfred Molina, Mía Maestro and Ashley Judd. The original score was composed by Elliot Goldenthal. The soundtrack features songs by various artists.

The score

The album won both the Academy Award and the Golden Globe Award for Best Original Score. At the World Soundtrack Awards it won two awards: "Best Original Soundtrack of the Year" and "Soundtrack Composer of the Year".

Track listing
 Benediction and Dream - Performed by Lila Downs (2:31)
 The Floating Bed (1:29)
 El Conejo - Performed by Cojolites (2:29)
 Paloma Negra - Performed by Chavela Vargas (3:17)
 Self-Portrait With Hair Down (1:09)
 Alcoba Azul - Performed by Lila Downs (1:36)
 Carabina 30/30 - Performed by El Poder Del Norte (2:43)
 Solo Tú (1:22)
 El Gusto  - Performed by Trio Huasteco Caimanes de Tamuin (2:18)
 The Journey (2:56)
 El Antifaz - Performed by Liberacion, Miguel Galindo, Alejandro Matehuala, Gerardo Garcia (2:28)
 The Suicide of Dorothy Hale (0:48)
 La Calavera (1:40)
 La Bruja - Performed by Salma Hayek and Los Vega (1:57)
 Portrait of Lupe (2:13)
 La Llorona - Performed by Chavela Vargas (2:22)
 Estrella Oscura - Performed by Lila Downs (1:48)
 Still Life (1:31)
 Viva la Vida - Performed by Trio / Marimberos (2:16)
 The Departure (2:13)
 Coyoacán and Variations (2:34)
 La Llorona - Performed by Lila Downs & Mariachi Juvenil de Tecalitián (2:20)
 Burning Bed (1:08)
 Burn It Blue - Performed by Caetano Veloso and Lila Downs (7:58)

Crew/Credit
Music Composed by Elliot Goldenthal
Music Produced by Teese Gohl and Elliot Goldenthal
Orchestrated by Elliot Goldenthal and Robert Elhai
Orchestra Conducted by Stephen Mercurio
Recorded and Mixed by Joel Iwataki
Electronic Music Produced by Richard Martinez
Music Editor: Curtis Roush

Certifications and sales

References

External links
 Page for the album at Goldenthal's website
 Review of the album at 'filmtracks.com'

Biographical film soundtracks
Elliot Goldenthal soundtracks
2002 soundtrack albums
Frida Kahlo
Scores that won the Best Original Score Academy Award